Debbie Meyers-Martin is a Democratic member of the Illinois House of Representatives for the 38th district. The district, located in the Chicago metropolitan area, includes all or parts of Country Club Hills, Flossmoor, Frankfort, Hazel Crest, Harvey, Homewood, Markham, Mokena, Oak Forest, Olympia Fields, Park Forest, Richton Park, Tinley Park.

Meyers-Martin won a four-way Democratic primary with a commanding 48% of the vote and ran unopposed in the 2018 general election. She previously served as the first African-American female mayor of Olympia Fields from December 2010 until May 2017. succeeding Linzie Jones (mayor from 1996 to 2010), the first African-American mayor of the city.

Meyers-Martin earned a bachelor of arts in criminal justice and pre-law from the University of Illinois at Chicago.

As of July 3, 2022, Representative Meyers-Martin is a member of the following Illinois House committees:

 Appropriations - General Services Committee (HAPG)
 Appropriations - Higher Education Committee (HAPI)
 Cities & Villages Committee (HCIV)
 Economic Opportunity & Equity Committee (HECO)
 Transportation: Regulation, Roads & Bridges Committee (HTRR)

Electoral history

References

External links
 Campaign website

Year of birth missing (living people)
21st-century American politicians
21st-century American women politicians
African-American state legislators in Illinois
African-American mayors in Illinois
People from Olympia Fields, Illinois
University of Illinois Chicago alumni
Women state legislators in Illinois
Democratic Party members of the Illinois House of Representatives
Living people
21st-century African-American women
21st-century African-American politicians
African-American women mayors